Peptidyl-prolyl cis-trans isomerase FKBP1B is an enzyme that in humans is encoded by the FKBP1B gene.

Function 

The protein encoded by this gene is a member of the immunophilin protein family, which play a role in immunoregulation and basic cellular processes involving protein folding and trafficking. This encoded protein is a cis-trans prolyl isomerase that binds the immunosuppressants FK506 (tacrolimus) and rapamycin (sirolimus). It is highly similar to the FK506-binding protein 1A. Its physiological role is thought to be in excitation-contraction coupling in cardiac muscle. There are two alternatively spliced transcript variants of this gene encoding different isoforms.

Clinical significance 
Defective interaction between FKB1B and the ryanodine receptor is thought to be a potential mechanism underlying the arrhythmias seen in those with the genetic condition catecholaminergic polymorphic ventricular tachycardia.

References

Further reading 

 
 
 
 
 
 
 
 
 
 
 
 
 
 
 
 

EC 5.2.1